Triplophysa longipectoralis is a cave-living species of stone loach with vestigial eyes. The fish lives in clear water at temperatures below 20 °C. The holotype was caught in Xunle town, Huanjiang Maonan Autonomous County in the Liu River basin, Guangxi, China and was described by Zheng et al. in 2009.

References

External links

 Image of the holotype found in the Liujiang River on SpringerImages (subscription needed to see full image)

L
Cave fish
Fish described in 2009
Freshwater fish of China
Endemic fauna of Guangxi